USS Ralph Johnson (DDG-114) is an  of the United States Navy. Ralph Johnson is the 64th ship of the class and was commissioned on 24 March 2018.

Construction and career
The contract to build the destroyer was awarded on 26 September 2011 to Ingalls Shipbuilding of Pascagoula, Mississippi. On 15 February 2012, Secretary of the Navy Ray Mabus announced the ship was to be named Ralph Johnson in honor of Marine Ralph H. Johnson, who was posthumously awarded the Medal of Honor for shielding two fellow Marines from a grenade in March 1968 during the Vietnam War. The contract was worth $697.6 million fixed price, and was also the 30th Arleigh Burke-class destroyer contract issued to Ingalls Shipbuilding.

Ralph Johnson is the 64th ship of the Arleigh Burke class of destroyers, the first of which, was commissioned in July 1991. With 75 ships planned to be built in total, the class has the longest production run for any U.S. Navy surface combatant. As an Arleigh Burke-class ship, Ralph Johnsons roles included anti-aircraft, anti-submarine, and anti-surface warfare, as well as strike operations. During the long production run, the class was built in three flights—Flight I (DDG-51–DDG-71), Flight II (DDG-72–DDG-78), and Flight IIA (DDG-79– ). Ralph Johnson is a Flight IIA ship, and as such, features several improvements in terms of ballistic missile defence, an embarked air wing, and the inclusion of mine-detecting ability.

The first three ships (DDG-113—DDG-115) ordered following the product decision are known as the "restart" ships, while "technology insertion" ships (DDG-116—DDG-123) are expected to incorporate certain elements of Arleigh Burke class Flight III, which in turn will run from DDG-124 onwards. As a "restart" ship, Ralph Johnson  primarily features upgraded electronics; she was originally scheduled to be delivered in August 2016, but construction was delayed and delivery was rescheduled for late 2017 after sea trials were completed in the middle of the year.

The warship arrived at the Port of Charleston's Columbus Street Terminal on 19 March 2018 and was commissioned on 24 March.

Gallery

References

External links
 Navy to name destroyer after local native
 Five New U.S. Navy Ship Names Announced
 Navy names two ships for Marines
 Navy: 3 new ships to be named after war heroes

 

Arleigh Burke-class destroyers
2015 ships
Naval ships involved in the COVID-19 pandemic